Chambani (Magofu ya mji wa kale wa Chambani in Swahili )  is a historic site and  village located in Mkoani District of Pemba South Region. 
Its one of several National Historic sites on the island of Pemba. The site is located nine kilometres south of Chake-Chake, close to several sets of ruins, notably the Pujini Ruins, a 15th-century citadel, located close to the village of Pujini, two kilometres to the north.

See also
Historic Swahili Settlements

References

Swahili people
Swahili city-states
Swahili culture
Pemba Island